The 1900 United States presidential election in Utah took place on November 6, 1900, as part of the 1900 United States presidential election held in each of the forty-five contemporary states. State voters chose three representatives, or electors to the Electoral College, who voted for president and vice president.

Background
During its years as a territory the Republican Party's ancestral hostility to the polygamy of the Church of Jesus Christ of Latter-day Saints (LDS Church), whose members settled Utah and have dominated the region ever since, meant that Utah territorial politics until 1891 was dominated by the Mormon-hierarchy-controlled "People's Party" and the anti-Mormon "Liberal Party". Those Mormons who did affiliate with national parties generally were Democrats, who lacked moral qualms associated with polygamy and slavery – although the Liberal Party did have allies within the GOP.

In order to achieve statehood, however, the LDS Church disbanded the "People's Party" in 1891 and most LDS members moved towards the Democratic Party. In Utah's statehood year – 1896 – Democrat/Populist William Jennings Bryan, whose "free silver" platform was immensely attractive to a state with large silver reserves, won the Mormon State by a five-to-one margin. However, by Bryan's 1900 rematch with incumbent Republican President McKinley, the Republican Party's ancestral hostility to Mormonism was beginning to dissipate, and Republican National Committee Chairman Mark Hanna was able to persuade the Mormon hierarchy that Bryan's policies – financial and otherwise – were unsound.

Consequently, although the LDS Church had not established the links to the GOP that they were after the Utah legislature elected Reed Smoot, those Utah voters who had supported Bryan overwhelmingly in 1896 deserted him to a degree that narrowly proved sufficient to give the state's three electoral votes to McKinley. Apart from Washington County in the Dixie region, McKinley was competitive everywhere and in Kane County – later a famous Republican bastion – he received over seventy percent. This remains easily the closest presidential election in Utah history, and with the state voting essentially as the nation did, it was decisive in placing the Mormon State in the mainstream of US politics, where Utah remained until becoming a Republican bastion in the 1950s and 1960s.

Bryan would later lose Utah again, this time to William Howard Taft in 1908.

Results

Results by county

See also
 United States presidential elections in Utah

Notes

References

Utah
1900
1900 Utah elections